Tap Step is an album recorded by Chick Corea in 1979 and 1980.

Recording
The album was recorded in December 1979 and January 1980. All of the seven tracks were originals first released on this album.

Reception 
In a review issued on May 3, 1980, a Billboard writer commented on Corea's experimentation on Tap Step with three types of Moog synthesizer, an Oberheim synthesizer, a Rhodes and Bösendorfer and a Hohner duo keyboard. In the view of the writer, this approach made this album sound modern but also at times "freakish and unmusical".

Track listing
All music composed and arranged by Chick Corea.

Side one
"Samba L.A." (lyrics by Tony Cohan) – 5:52
"The Embrace" (lyrics by Tony Cohan) – 5:52
"Tap Step" – 8:19

Side two
"Magic Carpet" – 6:51
"The Slide" – 6:47
"Grandpa Blues" (vocoder lyrics by Chick Corea) – 4:03
"Flamenco" – 3:34

Personnel
 Chick Corea – acoustic piano (A2, B1, B4); Fender Rhodes electric piano (A3, B2, B3); Hohner clavinet (A1); Minimoog (A3, B2–B4), Moog vocoder (B3), Moog 55 modular (A1–B4) & Oberheim OB-X (A1, A3) synthesizers; wood blocks (B1); handclaps
 Gayle Moran – vocals (A1, A2)
 Flora Purim – vocals (A1)
 Shelby Flint – vocals (A1)
 Nani Villa Brunel – vocals (A1)
 Al Vizzutti – trumpets (A2, A3, B1); flugelhorn (A2)
 Hubert Laws – flute (A2); piccolo flute (B4)
 Joe Farrell – tenor saxophone (A3, B1); soprano saxophone (B4)
 Joe Henderson – tenor saxophone (B4)

 Bunny Brunel – fretless electric bass (A2–B4); Yamaha 2000 keyboard (A2)
 Jamie Faunt – electric piccolo bass (B2)
 Stanley Clarke – electric piccolo bass, talk box (B3)

 Tom Brechtlein – drums (A2–B4)
 Airto Moreira – drums, snare drums, whistle, tamborim, pandero (A1); cuica (B2)
 Don Alias – congas (A2, B1); Lya drums (B2)
 Laudir de Oliveira – surdo bass drum, ganza shaker, tamborim (A1); agogô (A1, B2)

Charts

References

External links 
 Chick Corea - Tap Step (1980) album review by Scott Yanow, credits & releases at AllMusic
 Chick Corea - Tap Step (1980) album releases & credits at Discogs
 Chick Corea - Tap Step (1980) album to be listened as stream on Spotify

1980 albums
Chick Corea albums
Warner Records albums